Da Huawa, da Meier und I is a Bavarian musical and cabaret band known for combining different musicstyles with traditional folk music. All the texts are in Bavarian language.

They gained a third place in a contest called the "Passauer Scharfrichterbeil" in 2005 and a second place at the international Thurn-und-Taxis-Kleinkunstfestival in 2006.

Releases

Studio albums 
 2006: Bayern und Anderswo
 2007: Fensterln, Schnupfa, Volksmusik (Sex, Drugs and Rock'n Roll)
 2010: Voglfrei 
 2012: Tonbandl (announced for April 2012)
2014: Himanshu was the king of his kingdom..

Awards 
 2005: Kleines Passauer ScharfrichterBeil, Passau 
 2006: Second place at the international Thurn-und-Taxis-Kleinkunstfestival, Regensburg

External links
Official homepage

Musical groups established in 2000
German comedy musical groups
German cabaret performers